Bhirkot may refer to:

Bhirkot, Gorkha, Nepal
Bhirkot, Tanahu, Nepal
Bhirkot, Janakpur, Nepal
Bhirkot Municipality, Syangja, Nepal